Eupsophus vertebralis also known as the Valdivian ground frog, is a species of frog in the family Alsodidae.
It is found in Argentina and Chile.
Its natural habitats are temperate forest, rivers, and intermittent freshwater marshes.
It is threatened by habitat loss.

References 

Eupsophus
Amphibians of Argentina
Amphibians of Chile
Taxonomy articles created by Polbot
Amphibians described in 1961